Come and Get It is a 1935 novel by American author Edna Ferber. A film version with the same title was produced in 1936.

Reception 
Come and Get It, a New York Times bestseller, was favorably reviewed in Kirkus Reviews.

References

1935 American novels
American novels adapted into films
Doubleday, Doran books
Novels by Edna Ferber